Meri Pyaari Bahania Banegi Dulhania is a 2001 Indian Hindi-language film directed by  Jayant Gilatar, starring Mithun Chakraborty, Rajeshwari Sachdev and Vishwajeet Pradhan. The film is the remake of the 1997 Tamil film Porkkaalam.

Plot

The film has family subject, where brother-sister sentiments was highlighted.

Cast

Mithun Chakraborty as Keshav 
Rajeshwari Sachdev as Mehndi 
Vishwajeet Pradhan 
Sindhu
Sheena
Shahid Khan
Atul Parchure
Satish Salagre
Sulbha Arya

References

External links
 
Full Hyderabad review
 http://ibosnetwork.com/asp/filmbodetails.asp?id=Meri+Pyaari+Bahania+Banegi+Dulhania
 https://archive.today/20130218040827/http://www.gomolo.in/Movie/MovieCastcrew.aspx?mid=7874
 http://www.indiaweekly.com/datacart/products/template_dvd.asp?ProductType=dvd&Detail=Detail&ProductId=4036
 https://www.youtube.com/watch?v=9LHGYXmtqPg
 https://www.youtube.com/watch?v=GhxikCHd0PU

2001 films
2000s Hindi-language films
Mithun's Dream Factory films
Films shot in Ooty